Robert Hunter Morris (February 15, 1808 – October 24, 1855) was an attorney and the 64th Mayor of New York City.

Early career 
Morris was born in New York City. His father Robert Morris, a prominent judge, moved the family to Claverack, New York, where Morris was raised. He attended Washington Seminary, afterwards studying law and attaining admission to the bar. He initially practiced in Columbia County before moving to New York City.

He served as an assistant to U.S. Attorney James A. Hamilton and as a member of the New York State Assembly in 1833 and 1834. In 1838, New York Governor William L. Marcy appointed Morris Recorder of New York City, a position equivalent to a deputy mayor.  He served in that capacity until 1841, when Governor William H. Seward removed him from office in connection with the Glentworth scandal.

Glentworth incident 
The Glentworth conspiracy involved a plot by tobacco inspector James B. Glentworth to send workers from Pennsylvania to New York under the guise of laying pipes for the city, but in reality to cast votes for Whig Presidential candidate William Henry Harrison. Morris, the district attorney, and then-Mayor Isaac Varian feared that documents essential to the ensuing grand jury would be destroyed, and so went personally to seize the documents.  Governor Seward removed Morris from office for his actions.

Later career 
Morris, a Democrat, became involved in the Tammany Hall political machine in the early 1840s.  He was elected mayor in 1841 by a slim margin, and again in 1842 and 1843 by more substantial margins.  While serving as mayor in 1841, Morris took part in the investigation and arrest of John C. Colt for the murder of Samuel Adams.

In 1845 Morris was appointed Postmaster of New York City, and he served until 1849.  In 1852 he became a justice of the New York Supreme Court.

Morris died in New York City on October 24, 1855.  He was buried at St. Ann's Episcopal Church in South Bronx.

References

Bibliography

 
 
Obituary Addresses on the Occasion of the Death of the Hon. Robert H. Morris.  1855.  Hayes, Hincks, Carey and Kempston.

Mayors of New York City
Democratic Party members of the New York State Assembly
1808 births
1855 deaths
People from Columbia County, New York
New York City Recorders
Claverack College alumni
New York Supreme Court Justices
Postmasters of New York City
19th-century American politicians
19th-century American judges